Croceibacterium soli is a Gram-negative, strictly aerobic and rod-shaped bacterium from the genus Croceibacterium which has been isolated from desert sand from the Tengger desert.

References

External links
Type strain of Altererythrobacter soli at BacDive -  the Bacterial Diversity Metadatabase

Sphingomonadales
Bacteria described in 2017